is a historic Japanese temple in the city of Hiroshima, Japan.

Overview
Mitaki-dera was founded in 809 during the Daidō era.

There are three falls, and the water will be used as an offering of water to the victims of the atomic bomb during the Hiroshima Peace Memorial Ceremony.

There is the wooden seated statue of Amida Nyorai in the Tahōtō.

Mitaki-dera is famous for sakura, autumn leaves and maples.

Mitaki-dera is the 13th of Chūgoku 33 Kannon Pilgrimage.

See also 
Kannon
Chūgoku 33 Kannon Pilgrimage
Amida Nyorai
Hiroshima Peace Memorial Ceremony
Mitaki Station
 For an explanation of terms concerning Japanese Buddhism, Japanese Buddhist art, and Japanese Buddhist temple architecture, see the Glossary of Japanese Buddhism.

External links 

広島市西区みたき散策マップ(in Japanese)

Buddhist temples in Hiroshima Prefecture
Tourist attractions in Hiroshima
Kōyasan Shingon temples
Kūkai